The Inner Loop, formerly a complete loop, is now a "C"-shaped freeway in downtown Rochester, New York, in the United States. Only the portions north of Interstate 490 (I-490) are signed as the "Inner Loop". The official western terminus of the Inner Loop is at I-490 exit 13 in the shadow of Frontier Field west of downtown, while the eastern terminus is at I-490 exits 15 and 16 directly south of downtown on the east bank of the Genesee River. This section of the loop is designated New York State Route 940T (NY 940T), an unsigned reference route, by the New York State Department of Transportation. Although the NY 940T designation is not signed, the road is signed with orange trapezoidal route markers containing the words "Inner Loop" in white.

Construction of the Inner Loop began in the early 1950s—when the city's population was well over 300,000 (33% higher than it was in 2000) —and completed in 1965. Over the past decade, traffic volume has remained constant on the roadway in some areas; however, overall usage from its completion to today has declined as jobs and residents continue to migrate away from the inner city. On December 2, 2014, the eastern section of the Inner Loop was closed as part of a project to replace it with a surface street at the cost of $21 million.

Route description

The Inner Loop forms a "C" around downtown Rochester, beginning, from west to east, at I-490 exit 13, a directional T interchange adjacent to Frontier Field, the home of the Rochester Red Wings. It heads to the northeast, passing Frontier Field and the High Falls business district as it runs parallel to the CSX Transportation-owned Rochester Subdivision railroad line. About  from I-490, the Inner Loop and the Rochester Subdivision both cross the Genesee River just south of where the river goes over High Falls. On the other side of the river, the highway turns toward the east, separating from the railroad a short distance southwest of Rochester's Amtrak station on Central Avenue. This is also the location of the first exit on the Inner Loop heading east—with Saint Paul Street and Clinton and Joseph Avenues—and is the beginning of the frontage roads that run parallel to the loop along its length.

East of Joseph Avenue, the route descends below grade-level and begins to run through a cut as it proceeds eastward across the northern edge of downtown. After passing under North Street, the Inner Loop begins to turn southward, connecting with both Scio and East Main Streets in the process. While the interchange with East Main Street is a right exit heading counterclockwise on the loop, it is a left exit heading clockwise, forcing the exit ramp to pass over the loop's counterclockwise lanes in order to reach Main Street. The expressway currently ends there, with a ramp to the right traversing under Main Street to connect with Union Street, which has been widened to replace the former Inner Loop. Prior to 2014, the expressway continued past East (NY 96), Monroe (NY 31), and Clinton (NY 15) Avenues before re-joining I-490, and Union Street was effectively a frontage road.

The Inner Loop was closed and completed by I-490; it once created a continuous beltway of limited-access highways around downtown Rochester. However, the I-490 portion of the loop is signed only as I-490, and the only section of the loop that is signed as the Inner Loop is the  segment designated as the unsigned NY 940T. Due to its proximity to downtown, the loop creates a division, both physically and mentally, between downtown Rochester and the remainder of the city. The only areas where it is possible to traverse the Inner Loop is where roadways cross the Loop via bridges over or under the highway---of which there were only four in nearly a mile of the eastern side of the highway.

History

The idea for a beltway around Rochester was conceived in the 1950s. At the time, the population of Rochester was roughly 332,000, which translated into poor traffic conditions within downtown. Despite some political obstacles, construction on the highway began in the early 1950s. Many structures were demolished to make way for the route, which was constructed in a cut through the densely populated neighborhoods that surrounded downtown. In 1965, an opening ceremony headlined by then-Governor Nelson Rockefeller officially opened the Inner Loop to traffic. The final price tag on the loop's construction was $34 million (equivalent to $ in ). The southern part of the Loop was incorporated into the newly constructed I-490 upon completion while the rest is designated as NY 940T, an unsigned reference route.

In the time since the Loop's construction, the population of Rochester has dropped to 210,565 as of the 2010 census—a reduction of a full one-third. As a result, traffic on the Inner Loop has declined accordingly. While traffic volume on the I-490 and northwestern portions of the loop have remained relatively high, the section east of the Genesee River has seen sharp declines in recent years.

Removal of expressway
One proposal in 2005, which was considered for federal aid, would have reduced the number of lanes on the loop between Clinton Avenue and Main Street to make room for additional shops and businesses on the streets adjacent to the Inner Loop. Another plan, developed in 2009, called for the portion of the Loop from Main Street to Monroe Avenue (NY 31) to be completely filled in and replaced with an at-grade boulevard. The $20 million project was approved by a city council committee in September 2011; however, a $15 million federal grant application was denied later in the year. Then, in 2012, Rochester Mayor Thomas Richards spent $2 million on further design work that strengthened the city's request for federal funding. On August 30, 2013, the city of Rochester was given a TIGER grant worth $18 million (2013 USD) to fill in the Inner Loop between Monroe Avenue and Charlotte Street. The new project also gave money to reconnect the neighborhoods separated by the Inner Loop, Park Avenue and South Wedge.

The Inner Loop was a prominent feature of "State of the City 2011: In The Loop", a two-month exhibition held by the Rochester Contemporary Art Center in 2011. The event featured various works reflecting on the history of the highway and downtown Rochester and aimed to provoke discussions about the future of the city.

Inner Loop East project
On December 2, 2014, the Inner Loop's eastern side was closed permanently to start construction of a transformation project on the Inner Loop. The route is no longer a complete loop, but terminates at a signalized intersection with East Main Street and University Avenue. The project, costing $21 million, turned most of the Inner Loop into a street. The project was declared completed on November 22, 2017. The New York Times praised the Inner Loop East project in a 2021 editorial as an achievement in removing urban highways to improve American cities, especially as the project allowed space for new construction development.

Future
Plans are underway to modify a northern portion of the loop in the same manner as the eastern portion. This latter project has the support of U.S. senators Chuck Schumer and Kirsten Gillibrand.

Exit list

References

External links

Limited-access roads in New York (state)
Transportation in Rochester, New York
Demolished highways in the United States
Beltways in the United States